KXWX (93.7 FM) is a radio station licensed to Mohave Valley, Arizona. The station broadcasts an alternative rock format and is owned by Big River Broadcasting LLC.

History

The station was first licensed as KVYL in August 2010, and originally aired an adult album alternative format, branded as "Vinyl FM", with programming from Timeless Cool. In 2018, the station switched to an alternative rock format branded 10 X Rock.

On March 14, 2023, the station changed its call sign to KXWX.

Translators
KXWX is also heard in Lake Havasu City, Arizona through a translator at 99.9 MHz and in Kingman, Arizona through translators at 93.3 MHz and 96.3 MHz

References

External links
 KXWX's official website
 
 
 
 
 
 
 

XWX
Radio stations established in 2010
2010 establishments in Arizona
Alternative rock radio stations in the United States